Wyoming Highway 225 (WYO 225) is a  state highway, named Otto Road, located in southwestern Laramie County west of Cheyenne, in the U.S. state of Wyoming.

Route description
Wyoming Highway 225 begins its western end at exit 348 of Interstate 80/US 30 east of Granite Canon. WYO 225 heads east toward Cheyenne, roughly paralleling I-80/US 30 to the south, as it was the former routing of the latter. Reaching the western outskirts of Cheyenne, the southern terminus of Wyoming Highway 222 (Roundtop Road) is intersected, which heads north to F.E. Warren AFB and also provides access to exit 357 of the interstate. Shortly thereafter, WYO 225 reaches its eastern end at exit 358 of I-80/US 30; however no access to the interstate is provided from westbound WYO 225. WYO 225 turns into I-80 Business and US 30 as US 30 leaves I-80 and joins the I-80 Business Loop west into Cheyenne, named West Lincolnway.

History
Highway 225 is the original routing of U.S. Route 30 before Interstate 80 was built and the US 30 designation transferred to the Interstate. WYDOT defines the route internally as Main Line Route 56B.

Major intersections

References

External links 

Cheyenne @ AARoads.com
aaroads.com - Wyoming Routes 200-299
WYO 225 - I-80/US 30 to WYO 222
WYO 225 - WYO 222 to I-80/I-80 BUS/US 30

225
Transportation in Laramie County, Wyoming
225
U.S. Route 30